The Brass Bottle is a 1900 comedy novel by the British writer Thomas Anstey Guthrie, under the pen name of F. Anstey, about a man who awakens a genie. In a much later review George Orwell praised the work, and noted how strong an influence it had on William Aubrey Darlington's 1920 work Alf's Button.

Film adaptations
It has been made into films on three occasions a 1914 British silent film The Brass Bottle, a 1923 American silent film The Brass Bottle and a 1964 American sound film The Brass Bottle.

References

Bibliography
 Goble, Alan. The Complete Index to Literary Sources in Film. Walter de Gruyter, 1999.

1900 British novels
Novels by Thomas Anstey Guthrie
British novels adapted into films
British comedy novels